The Department of Architecture is part of the Faculty of Architecture and History of Art in the University of Cambridge. Both Departments are housed in Scroope Terrace on Trumpington Street, Cambridge.

The department is currently led by James Campbell.

Notable alumni and staff 

The department has attracted numerous guest lecturers including Louis Kahn, Zaha Hadid, Kenneth Frampton, Alvar Aalto and Le Corbusier.

Alumni 

 Christopher Alexander, architect, co-author of A Pattern Language
 Anthony Armstrong-Jones, Lord Snowdon, photographer
 Joanna Bacon
 Peter Clegg (Stirling Prize, 2008)
 Catherine Cooke, architect and Russian scholar
 Dora Cosens
 Edward Cullinan (RIBA Gold Medal, 2008)
 Spencer de Grey, architect, Head of Design Foster and Partners 
 Philip Dowson (RIBA Gold Medal, 1981)
 Peter Eisenman
 Richard Feilden
 Prince Richard, Duke of Gloucester
 Vaughan Hart, architectural historian
 Robert Hurd
 Sumet Jumsai
 Patrick Lynch, architect, founder Lynch Architects
 Richard MacCormac, architect, founder of MJP Architects
 Lionel March
 James Mason
 Raymond McGrath
 Rowan Moore, architecture correspondent for The Observer
 Christopher Nicholson
 Eric Parry
 Sunand Prasad (RIBA President, 2007–09)
 Cedric Price
 Colin St John Wilson
 Colin Stansfield Smith (RIBA Gold Medal, 1991)
 Robert Tavernor
 Brenda and Robert Vale
 Sarah Wigglesworth
 Ken Yeang
 Keith Griffiths, founder of Aedas

Current and former staff 

 Bob Allies
 Peter Blundell Jones
 Peter Bicknell
 Hugh Casson
 George Checkley
 Peter Clegg (Stirling Prize, 2008)
 Charles Correa (RIBA Gold Medal, 1984)
 Frank Duffy (RIBA President, 1993–95)                    
 Peter Eisenmann
 Max Fordham
 Dean Hawkes
 Felipe Hernandez
 Deborah Howard
 Henry Castree Hughes
 David Leatherbarrow
 Leslie Martin (RIBA Gold Medal, 1973)
 Richard MacCormac (RIBA President, 1991–93)
 Mohsen Mostafavi
 Eric Parry
 Edward Prior
 David Roberts
 Colin Rowe (RIBA Gold Medal, 1995)
 Joseph Rykwert
 Peter Salter
 Colin St John Wilson
 James Stirling (Pritzker Prize Laureate)
 Dalibor Vesely

ARCSOC 
ARCSOC is the Department's Architecture Society, hosting club nights, as well as guest lectures and highly popular life-drawing evenings. The society entirely self-funds, organises, and designs the Department's end-of-year exhibition, typically held in London. Reviewing the 2017 edition held at Bargehouse OXO Tower for the Architects' Journal, James Soane praised the "skilful explorations of materiality and narrative" on display.

References

External links
 Official Website
 Cambridge Design Research Studio

Architecture, Department of
Architecture, Department of
Cambridge, University of